Greatest Hits is the fifth country album by the Oak Ridge Boys, released in 1980. It compiled most of their hits from their first four albums (1977 to 1980).

Track listing
"You're the One" (Bob Morrison) (3:01) from the album Y'all Come Back Saloon
"I'll Be True to You" (Alan Rhody) (3:42) From the album Y'all Come Back Saloon
"Trying to Love Two Women" (Sonny Throckmorton) (2:32) from the album Together
"Cryin' Again" (Rafe Van Hoy, Don Cook) (2:41) from the album Room Service
"Dream On" (Dennis Lambert, Brian Potter) (3:20) from the album The Oak Ridge Boys Have Arrived
"Leaving Louisiana in the Broad Daylight" (Rodney Crowell, Donivan Cowart) (3:04) From the album The Oak Ridge Boys Have Arrived
"Heart of Mine" (Michael Foster) (3:32) from the album Together
"Come On In" (Michael Clark) (2:59) from the album Room Service
"Sail Away" (Van Hoy) (3:33) from the album The Oak Ridge Boys Have Arrived
"Y'all Come Back Saloon" (Sharon Vaughn) (2:53) from the album Y'all Come Back Saloon

Personnel
Joe Bonsall
Duane Allen
Richard Sterban
William Lee Golden

Charts

Weekly charts

Year-end charts

References

The Oak Ridge Boys albums
1980 greatest hits albums
Albums produced by Ron Chancey
MCA Records compilation albums